The Edmonton tornado of 1987, an event also known as Black Friday to Edmontonians, was a powerful and devastating tornado that ripped through the eastern parts of Edmonton, Alberta, Canada and parts of neighbouring Strathcona County on the afternoon of Friday, July 31, 1987. It was one of seven other tornadoes in central Alberta the same day.

It killed 27 people, and injured more than 300, destroyed more than 300 homes, and caused more than C$332.27 million (equivalent to $ million in ) in property damage at four major disaster sites. The loss of life, injuries and destruction of property made it the worst natural disaster in Alberta's recent history and one of the worst in Canada's history.

Weather forecasts issued during the morning and early afternoon of July 31, 1987 for Edmonton revealed a recognition by Environment Canada of a high potential for unusually severe thunderstorms that afternoon.  Environment Canada responded swiftly upon receipt of the first report of a tornado touchdown from a resident of Leduc County which is immediately adjacent to Edmonton's southern boundary.

Summary 
In the week preceding July 31, a low pressure system sitting over southwestern British Columbia fed warm, humid air into central Alberta.  Daytime heating along with near-record dewpoints over Alberta triggered a series of strong thunderstorms that persisted throughout the week.  On July 31, a cold front developed over western Alberta, colliding with the warm moist air that persisted over the region. Forecasters recognized the elevated risk for severe weather early in the day. Weatheradio broadcasts and interviews with the media stressed "vicious thunderstorms" and "extremely strong and violent thunderstorms".
Severe thunderstorms developed rapidly over the foothills early in the day and quickly moved eastward. The first severe weather watches were issued over central Alberta late in the morning and continued early in the afternoon. At 1:40 pm, a severe weather watch was issued for the Edmonton area, including Leduc County, Parkland County, and Strathcona County. The watch was later upgraded to a warning at 2:45 pm as the line of storms approached the area. As the cluster of storms approached the Leduc area, a violent cell rapidly developed ahead of the main line of storms and sharply turned northward.

The storm passed east of Leduc, where the first tornado was reported by a weather spotter at 2:59 pm. The tornado was on the ground briefly before dissipating. Shortly after 3:00 pm, the tornado again touched down in the Beaumont area, tossing granaries and farm equipment as it grew in size and strength.

At 3:04 pm, a tornado warning was issued for the city.  The tornado moved into the southeast portion of the city as a multiple-vortex tornado, and tracked north along the eastern portions of Mill Woods, causing F2 to F3 damage.  The tornado continued northward crossing the Sherwood Park Freeway and eventually hitting the Refinery Row area at F4 intensity.  The tornado tossed several large oil tanks, levelled several industrial buildings, and several trailers were picked up and scattered at Laidlaw and Byers Transport. Grass scouring and windrowing of debris occurred, and damage in that area may have been borderline F5, but was never officially ranked as such.

The tornado weakened slightly as it passed over an open area between Baseline Road and the North Saskatchewan River. Still, it maintained F2 to F3 intensity as it tore through eastern parts of Clareview toward 4:00 pm, causing heavy damage to several homes in Kernohan, Bannerman and Fraser neighbourhoods. The tornado persisted as it headed northeast toward the Evergreen Mobile Home Park. There, the tornado completely destroyed nearly 200 mobile homes in the area, killed 15 people and injured numerous others.

Other area tornadoes
Not including the F4 tornado, five other tornadoes were reported. An F2 tornado touched down near Beaumont, south of Edmonton. It travelled through countryside east of Edmonton. Twenty-two minutes after the first tornado touchdown an F1 tornado touched down in Southeast Edmonton in an area that was mostly farmland. It travelled . There were also three F0 tornadoes in the Edmonton Area (to the north, northwest, and southwest) but too far away to be seen from the city.

Chronology of events 

The following is a chronology of events that occurred on July 31, 1987.

Post-disaster response 

While municipal emergency agencies, fire departments, ambulance and police were responding, Canada's Department of National Defence placed helicopters and ambulances on standby at Canadian Forces Base Edmonton, and provided reconnaissance flights for the City of Edmonton and the deputy prime minister.  At the onset of the storm Emergency Preparedness Canada established contact with the Government of Alberta Emergency Response Centre.  EPC established a liaison office at the response centre at approximately 1800 hours that same day.

As emergency personnel responded to the industrial area, potential threats from dangerous goods came to light.  Alberta's Compliance Information Centre dispatched its dangerous goods inspectors and the provincial environmental response team to the area.  The emergent post-disaster response period lasted for approximately three weeks including immediate disaster assistance for victims. At the end of August 1987 details of the overall damage costs were gathered and the Government of Alberta announced an extensive disaster recovery program with the assistance of the Government of Canada.

The Emergency Public Warning System, later replaced by Alberta Emergency Alert, was developed as a result of the 1987 tornado disaster. The warning system breaks into private and public broadcasts on radio, television and cable systems. It alerts the public for all disaster hazards that threaten to strike with little or no warning.  The warning system is also used for issuing Amber Alerts.

The tornado had also resulted in the first implementation of the Doppler weather radar concept in Canada in the early 1990s.  Edmonton's Carvel radar was one of only three Dopplers to exist in Canada at the time. It later became part of the Canadian weather radar network, which was Dopplerized starting in 1998.

In media
The song "Tornado '87" by The Rural Alberta Advantage, on their 2011 album Departing, was inspired by singer Nils Edenloff's experience as a child surviving the tornado.

See also 
 List of tornadoes and tornado outbreaks
 List of North American tornadoes and tornado outbreaks
 List of Canadian tornadoes
 Tornado myths

References

External links 
 
 CBC Broadcast Archive
 Tornadoes in Canada, CBC.ca
 Photos of the Edmonton tornado
 CTV News' YouTube video of Edmonton Tornado

F4 tornadoes by date
Edmonton,1987-07-31
Tornado,1987-07-31
1987 in Alberta
Tornadoes of 1987
1987-07-31
Edmonton,1987-07-31
July 1987 events in Canada
1987 disasters in Canada